BS Sure Shot Wołomin is a Polish women's basketball team based in Wolomin that played in the Sharp Torell Basket Liga.

2003/2004 season
BS Sure Shot Wołomin has taken the 10th place in the Sharp Torell Basket Liga.

2004/2005 season
The team will be dropped from STBL and will play in the 1st League next season.

Team history
The team has played many top level games in Poland.

Women's basketball teams in Poland
Sport in Masovian Voivodeship